The Active Travel (Wales) Act 2013 (anaw 7) was an Act of the National Assembly for Wales that was given royal assent on 4 November 2013.  The Act requires local authorities to continuously improve facilities and routes for pedestrians and cyclists and to prepare maps identifying current and potential future routes for their use. The Act also requires new road schemes (including road improvement schemes) to consider the needs of pedestrians and cyclists at design stage.  The law was passed after a six-year campaign led by Lee Waters, then director of Sustrans Cymru.

In 2016, 'lack of funds and leadership' and resistance from highways engineers, were among the factors blamed for the failure of the Act to deliver its potential.

In 2018, a report from the Welsh Assembly's Cross Party Group on the Active Travel Act, led by Lee Waters, found no increase in the numbers of people walking and cycling to work; the numbers going to school had actually declined. The report blamed a lack of leadership in councils and the Welsh Government.

References

Acts of the National Assembly for Wales
Transport in Wales